AMSD Ariadna is the first Russian web browser ever developed. It was developed by Advanced Multimedia System Design (AMSD) in early 1994.

Development
To spread word of the Internet in Russia, AMSD researched the web browser in 1994. It was released in 1995 and was ported to Windows 95 and Windows NT.

By the time of its introduction, Internet Explorer and Netscape Navigator, two no-cost browsers, were dominating the Russian browser market. Ariadna, however, wasn't free software and, despite its high quality, failed to make a stance in the market and was terminated a few years later.

Features
Being a pioneer browser, Ariadna has limited functionality compared to today's browsers. Some features include:

 HTML 3.2 support
 PNG support, including transparency (but not as background images)
 Limited Java support (only JDK 1.02)
 E-mail and text box support
 50,000 word English-Russian dictionary
 Data filter

Ariadna does not support animated GIFs or JavaScript.

See also
 Web browser
 History of the World Wide Web
 List of web browsers

References

External links
Ariadna Project Page
Chrome Themes Builder

1995 software
Discontinued web browsers
Windows web browsers